Aristaria is a genus of moths of the family Erebidae. It is monotypic, containing only the species Aristaria theroalis, which is found in the United States and Costa Rica.

References

Herminiinae
Monotypic moth genera
Moths of North America